The Berliner was the name given to the City Night Line service between Zürich and Berlin Ostbahnhof. It has been succeeded by the "Sirius" service from Ostseebad Binz to Zürich via Berlin.

Here are the stations the Berliner  served:

References

Named passenger trains of Germany
Night trains
Passenger rail transport in Germany